Ion Anton (born 3 December 1950 in Ghelauza, Strășeni District) is a Moldovan writer. He is a member of the Moldovan Writers' Union and the Writers' Union of Romania.

Notes

Living people
1950 births
People from Strășeni District
Moldovan writers
Moldovan male writers

Recipients of the Order of Honour (Moldova)